The Anti-Corruption Party (PAC) is a political party in Honduras. It was founded by sports journalist/television presenter Salvador Nasralla, who ran unsuccessfully in the 2013 Honduran presidential election. As of 2022, the party holds one seat in the national legislature and is currently led by Marlene Alvarenga.

References

Political parties in Honduras
Political parties established in 2012
2012 establishments in Honduras
Anti-corruption parties